Cymus melanocephalus is a species of pentatomomorphan bug in the family Cymidae, found in the Palearctic.

References

External links

 

Lygaeoidea
Palearctic insects
Insects described in 1861